The Select Stakes is a greyhound racing competition held annually at Kilcohan Park Greyhound Stadium located in the south of Waterford, Ireland. Ireland.  

It is a prestigious event targeted by many of Ireland's leading greyhounds and is an integral part of the Irish greyhound racing calendar.  The competition today is sponsored by Gain Feeds but in the past sponsors have included Waterford Glass and Red Mills.

Past winners

Venues & Distances
1970–2003 (Waterford 525y)
2004–2011 (Waterford 550y)
2012–present (Waterford 525y)

Sponsors and names
1965–1965 (Waterford Glass International)
1970–1975 (Marquis of Waterford Cup)
1976–1978 (Truboard Gold Cup)
1979–1997 (Waterford Glass Stakes/Waterford Crystal Stakes)
1998–1998 (Waterford Masters)
1999–2000 (Kearns Waterford Masters)
2002–2003 (Westside Business Park Waterford Masters)
2004–2005 (Michael Meade Waterford Masters)
2006–2008 (Gain Waterford Masters)
2009–2011 (Red Mills Waterford Masters)
2012–2019 (Gain Select Stakes)

References

Greyhound racing competitions in Ireland
Sport in Waterford (city)
Recurring sporting events established in 1965